Wesolowski is a surname. Notable people with the surname include:

 Fred Wesolowski, Canadian politician
 Józef Wesołowski (1948–2015), defrocked Roman Catholic Archbishop and apostolic nuncio
 James Wesolowski (born 1987), Australian footballer 
 Wayne Wesolowski, builder of miniature models